Color index is a geological term, an indicator of the types of minerals present, and the specific type of rock. The color index of an igneous rock is a measure of the ratio of dark colored, or mafic, minerals to light colored, or felsic, minerals.

Speaking broadly, mineral colour points out the specific gravity of the mineral, as minerals that are lighter in color tend to be less dense. Darker minerals typically tend to contain more of relatively heavy elements, notably iron, magnesium, and calcium.

References

External links and references

britannica.com reference
Another link

Geology